Julius "Izzy" Yablok (July 28, 1907 – August 14, 1983) was an American football back who played two seasons in the National Football League with the Brooklyn Dodgers and Staten Island Stapletons. He played college football at Colgate University and attended Boys High School in Brooklyn, New York.

Yablok was Jewish and nicknamed "Indian".

References

External links
Just Sports Stats

1907 births
1983 deaths
Players of American football from New York (state)
American football quarterbacks
American football defensive backs
American football running backs
Colgate Raiders football players
Brooklyn Dodgers (NFL) players
Staten Island Stapletons players
Sportspeople from Brooklyn
Players of American football from New York City
Boys High School (Brooklyn) alumni
Jewish American sportspeople
20th-century American Jews